Cursus:
 Cursus — a type of neolithic monuments on British islands
 Cursus or Cursus publicus — governmental transportation system in Ancient Rome, preimage of modern post
 Cursus velox — quick transport
 Cursus clabularis — heavy transport
 Cursus — a rhythmic pattern in the end of the sentence in Late Latin (— means stressed syllables):
 Cursus planus — pattern "— x x — x".
 Cursus tardus — pattern "— x x — x x".
 Cursus velox — pattern "— x x x x — x"
 Cursus — race type in Ancient Rome

Other 
 Cursus honorum — a sequence of magistracies for Roman politician.
 Cursus mathematicus — Latin-French course in mathematics.